League of the North may refer to:

Lega Nord, an Italian nationalist party
another term for the Second League of Armed Neutrality

See also
 Northern Alliance (disambiguation)